Muhammad Idrees is a Pakistani politician from Nowshera District, who had been a member of the Provincial Assembly of Khyber Pakhtunkhwa from May 2013 to May 2018 and from August 2018 to January 2023, belonging to the Pakistan Tehreek-e-Insaf. He also served as the chairman and a member of different committees.

Political career
Idrees was elected as the member of the Khyber Pakhtunkhwa Assembly on ticket of Pakistan Tehreek-e-Insaf, which is a right wing political party headed by politician Imran Khan, from PK-15 (Nowshera-IV) in 2013 Pakistani general election.

As of January 2018 he is the Chairman of Standing Committee No. 30 on Inter Provincial Co-ordination Department. And he is a member of different committees the likes of Public Accounts Committee, Administration Department, Communication and Works Department, Public Health Engineering Department. He also takes part in Committees on sports, culture, tourism, museums archeology and youth affairs department, on Population Welfare Department, on Planning and Development Department and on Auqaf, Hajj, religious and minority affairs department.
 In 2015 he was a chairman in Standing Committee no. 29 on Housing Department/Provincial Housing Authority.

References

Living people
Pashtun people
Khyber Pakhtunkhwa MPAs 2013–2018
People from Nowshera District
Pakistan Tehreek-e-Insaf MPAs (Khyber Pakhtunkhwa)
Year of birth missing (living people)